Stefan Štiljanović (fl. 1498 – 1543) was the last prominent Serbian nobleman of the period of Ottoman subjugation of Serbia, and according to folklore, he was the last Despot of Serbia. He ruled a large territory under the Hungarian crown, due to his famed operations against the Ottoman Empire in the frontiers. Štiljanović is venerated as a Saint in the Serbian Orthodox Church on the 4 October (Julian Calendar) or 17 October (Gregorian Calendar) which comes to the same thing.

Life 
Štiljanović was born in Paštrovići (modern Montenegro). Paštrovići was mentioned in 1377 as one of the Serbian opština, and in 1423 they became subjects of the Republic of Venice after signing a treaty amid the Ottoman expansion. He was elected the knez of Paštrovići in the Rezevici Monastery, and would be the last and most celebrated one. Štiljanović had seven mills in his possession. He left his possessions to his people for Syrmia (modern Serbia) after a feud with the Republic of Venice, in 1498. The same year he had the town of Morović built, where he would have his residence. In 1507 he gained the town of Siklós in Baranya by Louis II of Hungary.

During the succession war between Ferdinand I and John Zápolya, he took the side of Ferdinand. After the crowning of Ferdinand on November 3, 1527, he became administrator of Novigrad and Orahovica. He also gained the villages of Donji Miholjac and Glogovnica, estates in the Virovitica county and the town of Valpovo, in which he had his residence. He administered significant towns which had earlier been under the rule of Jovan Nenad. He had his own flotilla.

Štiljanović was the commander of the Slavonian frontiersmen who fought against the Ottoman Empire. In 1543, he was defeated and captured by the Ottomans, but Murat-beg spared his life because of his famous heroism and let him free. He left Slavonia, and his last years were spent in Siklós, where he died around 1543.

In 1634, Serbian Patriarch Pajsije I Janjevac sojourned at the Šišatovac Monastery and there he wrote the biography of Stefan Štiljanović in a modern revival of the traditional Serbian hagiographical literature. During World War II, as part of organized destruction of Serbian cultural heritage and history, the Croatian Ustaše pillaged Štiljanović's tomb. The remains were deliberately damaged and valuables, such as his crown, were stolen and taken to Zagreb. Serbian church officials managed to recover the remains, which were then transferred and buried on the Göntér hill.

Ottoman vezir Skeder-paša Mihajlović was his nephew (through his mother).

Sainthood 

His mortal remains were later moved to the Šišatovac monastery, then during World War II to the St. Michael's Cathedral in Belgrade. Štiljanović was proclaimed Saint by the Serbian Orthodox Church as Saint Despot Stefan Štiljanović, his feast day is on October 17. He is mentioned in a 1545 document of Šišatovac as a Saint.

According to tradition, his widow Jelena (also a Saint) founded the Petkovica monastery on the Fruška Gora. A church in Augsburg, Germany, is named after him and his wife: "Orthodox Parish of Saint Stefan and Saint Helena Stiljanovic".

See also 
 Kuveždin monastery, contemporary Serbian Orthodox monastery possibly built by Štiljanović

Annotations

References

Sources

 Đorđe V. Gregović, O PAŠTROVIĆIMA, Elektronska Biblioteka Kulture i Tradicije Boke
 Radomir Rakic, 1985, The Monastery of Rezevici, Petrovac na Moru, Elektronska Biblioteka Kulture i Tradicije Boke
 Univerzitet u Novom Sadu (University of Novi Sad), Šišatovac čeka neimare
 Vladimir Ćorović (Original: Istorija srpskoga naroda, 1941), Istorija srpskog naroda - Šesti Period, Srbi pod tuđom vlašću
 Miroslav Krleža 1975, Pomorska enciklopedija, Volume 2
 Drago Njegovan, Prisajedinjenje Vojvodine Srbiji, Novi Sad, 2004.
 Dr. Jovan Vukmanović - Paštrovići, Cetinje 1960

External links 

 Seobe Stefana Štiljanovića (in Serbian)
 Photo of his relics

Serbian saints of the Eastern Orthodox Church
Burials at St. Michael's Cathedral (Belgrade)
16th-century Christian saints
16th-century Serbian nobility
1543 deaths
Year of birth unknown